Faige Teitelbaum (April 19, 1912 - June 2, 2001), born Alta Faige Shapiro and known as the Satmar Rebbetzin, was an American Hasidic community leader. Tietelbaum's status as Rebbetzin was gained through her marriage to the first Rebbe (leader) of the Satmar Hasidic community, Rabbi Joel Teitelbaum (1887-1979). After her husband's death, the Satmar Rebbetzin gained a following of supporters who stood in opposition to her husband's successor, the second Rebbe of Satmar, Rabbi Moshe Teitelbaum (1914-2006).

Biography 

Faige Teitelbaum was born in Częstochowa, Poland, to Rabbi Avigdor Shapiro of the Kosnitz Hasidic dynasty. In 1936, she married Rabbi Joel Teitelbaum after the death of Joel's first wife. Following the death of Rabbi Joel Teitelbaum in 1979 and his succession by Moshe (Moses) Teitelbaum, a nephew of Joel, a segment of the Satmar community rejected the new leadership and remained committed to the deceased Rebbe. This group became known as Bnei Yoel ("The Children of Yoel"), and many of these Hasidim would regularly petition Faige for blessings and advice as they would normally would of a Hasidic Rebbe. This was a unique position for a Hasidic Rebbetzin in the post-World War II period, and Faige Teitelbaum is viewed as the only such woman in the late 20th century to function as a de facto rebbe and leader. The center of communal activity for Teitelbaum's followers was a synagogue on Bedford Avenue which was known as Bais Feige ("The House of Feige"). The alleigence to Faige Teitelbaum was reported to be the cause of a major rift in the Satmar community, leading to a federal lawsuit between Tietelbaum and her nephew, the second Satmar Rebbe. In some cases, public violence erupted between Satmar Hasidim.

Legacy 
Teitelbaum's charitable activities included establishing the Satmar Bikur Cholim kosher food distribution network for Orthodox hospital patients.

See also 
 Bnei Yoel

Further reading 
 Rockove, Moshe. "Rebbetzin Alta Feiga Teitelbaum". Dei'ah VeDibur, August 8, 2001.
 Martin, Douglas. "Faiga Teitelbaum, 89, a Power Among the Satmar Hassidim". The New York Times, June 13, 2001, 15C.

References 

1912 births
2001 deaths
People from Częstochowa
American Orthodox Jews
American people of Polish-Jewish descent
Rebbetzins
Satmar (Hasidic dynasty)
Teitelbaum family